The Roatán Marine Park (RMP), based in Roatán, Honduras, is a grass roots, community-based, non-profit organization, non governmental organisation (NGO) established in January 2005 by a group of dive operators and local businesses that were concerned about the alarming rate of reef degradation in the Sandy Bay-West End Marine Reserve (SBWEMR). With a rapidly developing island, the number of challenges the RMP face increases daily.

References

External links
Roatán tourism site
Roatán Marine Park site

Marine reserves
Roatán